Depot Creek is a river in Sudbury District in Northeastern Ontario, Canada, near the community of Cartier. It is in the Great Lakes Basin and is a left tributary of Carhess Creek.

The creek begins at Depot Lake in geographic Hess Township, flows south through Paddy's Lake into geographic Cartier Township, and reaches its mouth at Carhess Creek. Carhess Creek flows via the Onaping River, the Vermilion River and the Spanish River to Lake Huron.

See also
List of rivers of Ontario

References

Sources

Rivers of Sudbury District